Catada obscura is a moth of the family Erebidae first described by Joseph de Joannis in 1906. It is found on Réunion and Mauritius.

References

Moths described in 1906
Hypeninae
Moths of Mauritius
Moths of Réunion